Sagrado is a railway station serving the town of Sagrado, in the region of Friuli-Venezia Giulia, northern Italy. The station is located on the Udine–Trieste railway. The train services are operated by Trenitalia.

Train services
The station is served by the following service(s):

Express services (Regionale Veloce) Venice - Gorizia - Udine - Treviso - Trieste
Regional services (Treno regionale) Venice - Gorizia - Udine - Treviso - Trieste

See also

History of rail transport in Italy
List of railway stations in Friuli-Venezia Giulia
Rail transport in Italy
Railway stations in Italy

References

 This article is based upon a translation of the Italian language version as of January 2016.

External links

Railway stations in Friuli-Venezia Giulia